The Egg Crate Wallop is a 1919 American silent comedy film starring Charles Ray and featuring actress Colleen Moore. The film was directed by Jerome Storm and Thomas H. Ince was its producer.

Plot
Jim Kelly (Charles Ray) works for a railroad express company in a small Midwest town. After years of heavy lifting, he has developed quite a punch. He is infatuated with Kitty Haskell (Colleen Moore), the daughter of his boss (J.P. Lockner), whom he has worked with for years. Jim has a rival for Kitty's attentions, a city boy who one day watches Mr. Haskell deposit money in the railroad safe. He memorized the combination and later steals the deposit from the safe. Suspicion for the theft falls on both Mr. Haskell and Jim, and Jim decides to go on the run, thinking that Mr. Haskell is guilty and hoping to divert attention from him. He goes to the city, develops his boxing skills, moves to the top of the roster and on the night of the big fight he refuses to throw the bout. He discovers his rival with some of the missing cash, and turns him in... freeing Mr. Haskell and winning the love of Kitty.

Cast
Charles Ray as Jim Kelly
Colleen Moore as Kitty Haskell
Jack Connolly as Perry Woods
J. P. Lockney as Dave Haskell
George B. Williams 'Fatty' Brennan (credited as George Williams)
Frederick Moore as Assistant Promoter (credited as Fred Moore)
Otto Hoffman as 'Spider' Blake
Edward Jobson as Constable (credited as Ed Jobson)
Dewitt Van Court as Fight Referee
Arthur Millett as 'Battling' Miller
Al Kaufman as Fighter (credited as Al Kauffman)
Ray Kirkwood as Fighter
Cliff Jordan as Fighter
Jimmie Fortney as Fighter
Izzie Glassor as Fighter

Production
Jerome Storm had directed many of Charles Ray's films, most with an athletic theme. Besides this film with Ray as a boxer, he would star in The Busher with Colleen, wherein he was a baseball player. A number of real boxers were brought in to spar with Ray, and were filmed as characters.

Preservation status
The film is listed FIAF / Library of Congress database as being preserved in the Gosfilmofond collection in Russia.

References

Notes
New York Times on The Egg Crate Wallop.

Bibliography
Jeff Codori (2012), Colleen Moore; A Biography of the Silent Film Star, McFarland Publishing, (Print , EBook ).

External links

 
 TCM.com entry
 Progressive Silent Film List: The Egg Crate Wallop at silentera.com
 http://boxrec.com/media/index.php/The_Egg_Crate_Wallop
 http://movies.amctv.com/movie/90322/Egg-Crate-Wallop/overview

1919 films
Films directed by Jerome Storm
American sports comedy films
American boxing films
American silent feature films
1910s sports comedy films
American black-and-white films
Paramount Pictures films
1910s English-language films
1910s American films
Silent American comedy films
Silent sports comedy films